Jalan Pekeliling 4, Federal Route 343, is a federal road in the Kuala Lumpur International Airport (KLIA), Malaysia.

The Kilometre Zero is located at KLIA Outer Ring Road junctions.

At most sections, the Federal Route 343 was built under the JKR R5 road standard, allowing maximum speed limit of up to 90 km/h.

List of junctions

References

Malaysian Federal Roads
Kuala Lumpur International Airport
Roads in Selangor